Space Adventures - Music from 'Doctor Who' 1963 - 1968 is a collection of stock music used in the BBC TV series Doctor Who.  First issued on cassette in September 1987 in a limited edition of 300 copies by DWAS, it was reissued on CD, expanded to cover through 1971, by the researcher Julian Knott, again in a limited issue of 300 copies.

Track listing

Original Cassette

CD Bonus Tracks

References

Doctor Who soundtracks